Santo Amaro is a metro station on Line 5 (Lilac) of the São Paulo Metro in the Santo Amaro district of São Paulo, Brazil.

CPTM transfer
Passengers may transfer from here to Line 9 (Emerald) of the CPTM commuter train.

SPTrans lines
The following SPTrans bus lines can be accessed. Passengers may use a Bilhete Único card for transfer:

References

São Paulo Metro stations
Railway stations opened in 2002